A Case Information Statement (or Cover Sheet) is a document which is filed with a court clerk at the commencement of a civil lawsuit in many of the court systems of the United States.  It is generally filed along with the complaint.  Some states use similar documents for criminal cases as well.

Purpose and terminology

The purpose of a Case Information Statement is to let the judge and court clerk know what type of case is being brought by the parties, so that they can better prepare for the case to come to trial.  Some courts (for example, the New Jersey Superior Court) put different types of cases on different "tracks", to place limits on how long discovery they should take.

If the lawyer filling out the Case Information Statement makes a mistake, or if circumstances change or new information is discovered, the party wishing to amend the statement may do so by making a motion to the judge in charge of the case.

Some courts use the term Cover Sheet for this document, but the content and purpose is the same.  For example, the equivalent document in federal district courts is Form JS-44, Civil Cover Sheet.  Similarly, the Superior Courts of California have a Form CM-010, Civil Case Cover Sheet.

Case Information Statements in civil cases
Questions typically asked on Civil Case Information Statements include:
The underlying subject matter of the lawsuit
Amount in controversy or remedies demanded
Whether a jury trial is requested by either party
Whether there are additional parties to be joined
Whether the lawsuit is a potential class action or some other type of complex case
Whether there are similar actions pending in other courts
What, if any, previous relationship exists between/among the parties (e.g. employment, familial, business associates, etc.)
Whether attorney fees are in contention (in some types of cases, attorney fees must be paid by the losing party)

In family law cases (such as divorce and child custody matters), the questions asked on the Case Information Statement are often longer and more detailed, requiring recitation of each party's employment situation, current income, and the assets and liabilities of each party.

Case Information Statements in criminal cases
Questions typically asked on Criminal Case Information Statements include:
The attorneys involved in the case
The basic facts and circumstances involved
Whether the defendant is currently in custody or out on bail
Whether there are co-defendants
Whether all issues will be disposed of by this case
Whether the constitutionality of any statute, regulation, or executive order is being challenged

New York's Request for Judicial Intervention

New York's equivalent document is the Request for Judicial Intervention, which is necessary because in New York a case begins with the service of a complaint and nothing is filed with the trial court until absolutely necessary (usually because a discovery dispute develops, someone wants to file a dispositive motion, or it is actually time for trial).  At that time, the party seeking judicial intervention files a RJI (which asks for information similar to a CIS or cover sheet) and files with the court all relevant documents from the party's own version of the case file.

References
Greenberg, Bruce Esq. and Wolinetz, Gary K. Esq. Civil Trial Preparation. New Jersey Institute for Continuing Legal Education, 2007.

External links

State Links to Civil Cover Sheets - from the National Center for State Courts

Examples of case information statements
Civil Case Information Statement, from the New Jersey Superior Court
Civil Case Information Statement, from the New Jersey Superior Court, Chancery Division, Family Part
Criminal Case Information Statement, from the New Jersey Superior Court
Civil Case Information Statement from the California Courts of Appeal
Civil Case Information Statement from the Circuit Courts of West Virginia.

Examples of civil cover sheets
Form CM-010, Civil Case Cover Sheet from the Superior Courts of California

Statements (law)
Legal procedure